Acoyapa is a town and a municipality in the Chontales Department of Nicaragua. Its name comes from the word "Acoyaph" which means "place from above".

Geography 
The municipality is bordered by  Juigalpa, San Pedro de Lóvago, and Santo Tomás municipalities to the north, by Villa Sandino and El Coral municipalities to the east, by El Almendro and Morrito municipalities to the south, and by Lake Nicaragua to the west.

Demographics 
Acoyapa has an estimated population of 20,301 inhabitants. 50.4% of them are females and 49.6% of them are males. About 50.3% of the population lives in an urban area.

References

External links
Acoyapa official site in Spanish

Municipalities of the Chontales Department